Leonidas is a registered trademark of the agri-food company Confiserie Leonidas S.A. The Belgian chocolate company was founded in 1913 by Leonidas Kestekides. The company is ISO 9001 and FSSC 22000 certified. As of 2019, the brand has more than 1,030 points of sale (including 450 stores in Belgium and Luxembourg, and 290 in France) in 32 countries, the majority of which are franchises and around 40 are subsidiaries.

History
Born in 1882 in Nigdi, Anatolia, Turkey, a politically and economically unstable region, Leonidas Georges Kestekides, of Greek heritage, made a living by selling "granitas", a kind of sorbet, and other sweets with his brother, Avraam.
In 1900, he decided to move to the United States where he became a confectioner.

In 1910, Leonidas participated at the World Fair in Brussels, Belgium, where he won the bronze medal alongside the Greek delegation. While in Brussels, he met Joanna Emelia Teerlinck.
Together, they moved to Ghent, where the International Exhibition was held in 1913. There he won the gold medal and opened his first tearoom at 34 Veldstraat.

From 1922 onwards, members of Leonidas' family joined him in Belgium to work alongside him. Among them was his brother Dimitrios’ son, Vassilios Kestekides, who they later called Basilio, and whom Leonidas mentored. Leonidas was creative, and Basilio had a good head for business; together they came up with many ideas to expand the company's activities. The business was expanding to scales larger than Ghent. As such, Leonidas left to open the "Pâtisserie Centrale Leonidas" in Brussels, on rue Paul Delvaux, and left the management of the Ghent tearoom to the rest of his family. Basilio joined him.

Once in Brussels, things went well for Basilio. He worked hard; at night he made his chocolates in his small workshop near the capital's main square, on rue du Vieux Marché aux Grains. In the morning, he drove a horse-drawn cart among the surrounding neighbourhoods, selling his delicacies. In 1935, after being accused by the police of street trading, he was ordered to sell his products in a store. As a result, he rented a room in a building at 58 Boulevard Anspach. But given the small size of this room, which did not even have a door onto the main street, only one possibility remained: open the only window and display his chocolates on the windowsill. This was a revolutionary idea that allowed passers-by to enjoy the delicious scent of chocolate products and buy chocolates on the spot. Selling through a sliding sash window would remain the trademark of the brand for decades.

In 1937, he officially registered his brand with the City of Brussels. The brand's font and logo were chosen by Basilio Kestekides in honor of the Greek roots of his uncle. He used the effigy of the King of Sparta, Leonidas I, who died in the Battle of Thermopylae during his opposition to the Second Persian invasion of Greece.
Leonidas died on 20 February 1948. More motivated than ever to 'make luxury accessible to all', Basilio decided to expand his workshop to produce more, and thus better meet growing consumer demand. Leonidas' philosophy has never been to turn its chocolates into a scarce product in order to sell them at higher prices, but rather to increase production to keep the prices low. The brand's signs alone were used to advertise the business up to the early 1980s. However, in 1985, Leonidas was forced to publish an advertisement in all national newspapers. Very curiously, rather than promoting its products, Leonidas sent a message that was a first in the history of advertising; it asked people who were interested in selling chocolates to stop sending requests to open a shop because production could not keep up with demand.

Leonidas' chocolates are made without palm oil.. They are made with Belgian chocolate and cocoa butter.

Leonidas' principal chocolate is the "Manon". It was Basilio, Leonidas’ nephew, who introduced the Manon to the Leonidas range. At the time, the Manon, filled with a butter cream on a crunchy nougatine base, was dipped in melted sugar using a fork. In his quest to create a diverse range of products, Basilio wanted to experiment with a white chocolate coating. A few years later, he placed the butter cream on a white chocolate praliné base instead of a nougatine base. Even as late as 1980, the Manon was still handmade: each and every walnut kernel was placed in the praline by hand. Faced with increasing demand for Leonidas products, Yanni, Basilio's brother, wanted to automate the production processes and operate under stricter hygiene rules. Since the walnut could not be roasted and the storage conditions for this dry fruit were tricky, he replaced it with the hazelnut, which could be roasted and kept better. Yanni put the finishing touches to his Manon and the recipe, which has remained unchanged since then.
As the company grew, Basilio asked his second brother, Alexandre, to come and help him. Alexandre's scientific knowledge, especially of chemistry, allowed him to carry out research to develop a range of chocolates: this meant new flavors and new manufacturing processes. Alexandre built the company's first machine.

On 15 November 2013, the company became a certified purveyor to the Belgian royal household. The level of brand awareness was 91% in 2018.

Leonidas has been a family business ever since it was founded. Leonidas celebrated its 100th anniversary in 2013.

References

External links

 
 Leonidas Chocolates Serving the USA since 1991
 Leonidas USA website

Belgian brands
Belgian chocolate companies
Manufacturing companies based in Brussels
Food and drink companies established in 1913
Belgian companies established in 1913